Capillistichus is a genus of fungi in the family Laboulbeniaceae. A monotypic genus, Capillistichus contains the single species Capillistichus tenellus.

References

External links
Capillistichus at Index Fungorum

Laboulbeniaceae
Monotypic Laboulbeniomycetes genera
Laboulbeniales genera